Stephen Ng Heng Seng is a Singaporean football coach and former footballer. He is also an AFC instructor for coaches as well. Ng is currently the national coach for the Singapore women's national football team.

Coaching career

Brunei

Youth 
Leading the Brunei Under-16 in their 2014 AFC U-16 Championship qualification campaign which ran from 21 to 29 September 2013, Heng Seng returned to coach the Brunei Under-14s in 2016 for the AFC U14 Regional Festival of Football, prophesying a good run in the competition. The Singaporean also took the reins of the Brunei U15 in 2017, taking them to their first ever win in the AFF U-15 Championship that year, beating Cambodia 2-0. He also coached the Under-15s in their 2018 AFC U-16 Championship qualifiers.

In his opinion, the Brunei National Under-16 Youth League has benefits for youth players development for the reason that it will expose them to competitive matches.

Under-23 
As head coach of the Brunei Olympic team in 2015 for their 2016 AFC U-23 Championship qualification campaign, Heng Seng blamed a narrow 2-0 loss to Indonesia on a fortuitous strike by Ahmad Noviandani in the 71st minute, claiming it was unintended. He was manager of the Olympic team in the 2015 SEA Games as well, stating that his team prepared well for the competition and their first group stage clash countering Vietnam.

Ng was designated head coach of the under-23s for the 2020 AFC U-23 Championship qualification matches held in late March 2019 in Vietnam. Unfortunately he has now been mistaken for assistant Darus Tanjong due to the latter taking press conferences instead of Ng.

Singapore 
In 2021, Ng was appointed at the Singapore women's national football team's head coach for two years.

References 

Year of birth missing (living people)
Living people
Singaporean football managers
Singaporean footballers
Singaporean sportspeople of Chinese descent
Association football goalkeepers
Singapore international footballers
Expatriate football managers in Brunei
Singaporean expatriate sportspeople in Brunei
Southeast Asian Games bronze medalists for Singapore
Southeast Asian Games medalists in football
Competitors at the 1993 Southeast Asian Games
Singaporean expatriate football managers
Women's national association football team managers